Bukky Abaniwonda, popularly called Bukky Wonder, is a Canadian actress of Nigerian descent.  She is best known for the films Bridges, Awkward Things About Losing Weight and The Carperdian.

Personal life
She was born in Canada as the second of the family with five siblings. She spent her childhood in Abuja. She has two brothers and two sisters. She attended Command Day Secondary School, Abuja for high school studies. Then she graduated with an accounting degree from Bowen University.

Career
In 2017, she played the lead role in the film Bridges directed by Rogers Ofime.  Then she acted in the film It's The End.

In 2020, Abaniwonda directed the first Afro-Canadian web serial The African Family which is almost exclusively an all-Black production. It has been shot in Calgary. The cast included African actors from Nigeria, Congo and Angola.

References

External links
 
 First-of-its-kind African-Canadian film production in Calgary showcases Black talent

Living people
Canadian film actresses
Canadian people of Nigerian descent
Year of birth missing (living people)
Canadian expatriates in Nigeria
Canadian web series actresses
21st-century Canadian actresses
Bowen University alumni